In mathematics, more specifically non-commutative ring theory, modern algebra, and module theory, the Jacobson density theorem is a theorem concerning simple modules over a ring .

The theorem can be applied to show that any primitive ring can be viewed as a "dense" subring of the ring of linear transformations of a vector space. This theorem first appeared in the literature in 1945, in the famous paper "Structure Theory of Simple Rings Without Finiteness Assumptions" by Nathan Jacobson. This can be viewed as a kind of generalization of the Artin-Wedderburn theorem's conclusion about the structure of simple Artinian rings.

Motivation and formal statement
Let  be a ring and let  be a simple right -module. The natural question now is whether this can be generalized to arbitrary (finite) tuples of elements.

With the above in mind, the theorem may be stated this way:

The Jacobson density theorem. Let  be a simple right -module, and  a finite and -linearly independent set.

Proof
In the Jacobson density theorem, the right -module  is simultaneously viewed as a left -module where , in the natural way: .

The proof also relies on the following theorem proven in  p. 185:

Theorem. Let  be a simple right -module, and  a finite set.

Proof of the Jacobson density theorem 
If  is empty, then the theorem is vacuously true and the base case for induction is verified.

Write . Since  is simple, we have: . Since , there exists  in  such that .

Define  and observe that for all  in  we have:

Now we do the same calculation for :

This completes the inductive step of the proof. It follows now from mathematical induction that the theorem is true for finite sets  of any size.

Topological characterization
A ring  is said to act densely on a simple right -module  if it satisfies the conclusion of the Jacobson density theorem. There is a topological reason for describing  as "dense".

Consequences
The Jacobson density theorem has various important consequences in the structure theory of rings. Notably, the Artin–Wedderburn theorem's conclusion about the structure of simple right Artinian rings is recovered. The Jacobson density theorem also characterizes right or left primitive rings as dense subrings of the ring of -linear transformations on some -vector space , where  is a division ring.

Relations to other results
See also the Kaplansky density theorem in the von Neumann algebra setting.

Notes

References

External links
PlanetMath page

Theorems in ring theory
Module theory
Articles containing proofs